Ingvild Ryggen Kristinsdatter Carstens (born 14 October 1980) is a Norwegian ski mountaineer and former heptathlete.

Carstens hails from Trondheim, and attended the Trondheim Cathedral School. Currently she lives in Innsbruck, Austria, where she studied at the university.

Selected results 
Together with Malene Haukøy and Mari Fasting, she participated in the Norwegian women's relay team at the 2011 World Championship of Ski Mountaineering, which finished eighth.

As a heptathlete she achieved 4.478 points as her personal best; in May 2004 in Las Vegas.

External links 
 Ingvild Ryggen Carstens at skimountaineering.org

References 

1980 births
Living people
Norwegian female ski mountaineers
Norwegian heptathletes
University of Innsbruck alumni
Norwegian expatriates in the United States
Norwegian expatriates in Austria
People educated at the Trondheim Cathedral School
Sportspeople from Trondheim